Wing Commander Percival Kinnear Wise   (17 April 1885 – 7 June 1968) was a British Olympic polo player and Royal Air Force officer.

Biography
Wise was born on 17 April 1885 in Hong Kong to Alfred Gascoyne Wise and Augusta Frances Nugent. His father was a judge for the Supreme Court of Hong Kong, and his brother was Alfred Roy Wise.

He was a Group Captain in the military and served with the British Indian Army and then the Royal Flying Corps. For his services in the First World War, he was made a Companion of the Distinguished Service Order and the Order of St. Michael and St. George.

He won the bronze medal in the 1924 Paris Summer Olympic Games alongside teammates Frederick W. Barrett, Frederick Guest, and Dennis Bingham.

He died on 7 June 1968 in Aldeburgh.

References 

Polo players at the 1924 Summer Olympics
Olympic bronze medallists for Great Britain
Olympic polo players of Great Britain
British polo players
Roehampton Trophy
Hong Kong people
1885 births
1968 deaths
Companions of the Order of St Michael and St George
Companions of the Distinguished Service Order
Royal Flying Corps officers
Medalists at the 1924 Summer Olympics
Royal Air Force group captains
Olympic medalists in polo